The Wilson River, New Zealand is a river in southern Fiordland, New Zealand.

See also
List of rivers of New Zealand

References

Rivers of Fiordland